The Concept of Anxiety: A Simple Psychologically Orienting Deliberation on the Dogmatic Issue of Hereditary Sin, is a philosophical work written by Danish philosopher Søren Kierkegaard in 1844.  The original 1944 English translation by Walter Lowrie (now out of print), had the title The Concept of Dread.  The Concept of Anxiety was dedicated "to the late professor Poul Martin Møller". Kierkegaard used the pseudonym Vigilius Haufniensis (which, according to Josiah Thompson, is the Latin transcription for "the Watchman" of Copenhagen) for The Concept of Anxiety.

All of Kierkegaard's books have either a preface, dedication, or prayer at the beginning. This book includes a lengthy introduction. The Concept of Anxiety was published on exactly the same date as Prefaces, June 17, 1844. Both books deal with Hegel's idea of mediation. Mediation is a common thread throughout Kierkegaard's works. His work up to this point was to show that faith was being mediated by knowledge. Here he takes up the questions of sin and guilt.

For Kierkegaard, anxiety/dread/angst is "freedom's actuality as the possibility of possibility." Kierkegaard uses the example of a man standing on the edge of a tall building or cliff. When the man looks over the edge, he experiences an aversion to the possibility of falling, but at the same time, the man feels a terrifying impulse to throw himself intentionally off the edge. That experience is anxiety or dread because of our complete freedom to choose to either throw oneself off or to stay put. The mere fact that one has the possibility and freedom to do something, even the most terrifying of possibilities, triggers immense feelings of dread. Kierkegaard called this our "dizziness of freedom".

Kierkegaard focuses on the first anxiety experienced by man: Adam's choice to eat from God's forbidden tree of knowledge or not. Since the concepts of good and evil did not come into existence before Adam ate the fruit, Adam had no concept of good and evil, and did not know that eating from the tree was "evil". What he did know was that God told him not to eat from the tree. The anxiety comes from the fact that God's prohibition itself implies that Adam is free and that he could choose to obey God or not. After Adam ate from the tree, sin was born. So, according to Kierkegaard, anxiety precedes sin. Kierkegaard mentions that anxiety is the presupposition for hereditary sin (which Augustine was the first to call peccatum originale, "original sin").

However, Kierkegaard mentions that anxiety is a way for humanity to be saved as well. Anxiety informs us of our choices, our self-awareness and personal responsibility, and brings us from a state of un-self-conscious immediacy to self-conscious reflection. (Jean-Paul Sartre calls these terms pre-reflective consciousness and reflective consciousness.) An individual becomes truly aware of their potential through the experience of anxiety. So, anxiety may be a possibility for sin, but anxiety can also be a recognition or realization of one's true identity and freedom. Alternatively, sin exists in the very resolution of anxiety through right and wrong; why to embrace anxiety is to not pass judgement.

Progress

In 1793, forty-one years before Kierkegaard wrote The Concept of Anxiety, Immanuel Kant wrote his book Religion Within the Limits of Reason Alone; his book elevated reason in the realm of Christianity. Many continental philosophers wrote their books in relation to Kant's ideas. Kierkegaard was familiar with Book Two of Kant's book The Conflict of the Good with the Evil Principle for Sovereignty over Man and he made a similar study in this book; however, he might call it the conflict of ethics and anxiety for sovereignty over man. Kierkegaard would replace Kant's term "Good" with "Ethics" and his term "Evil" with "Anxiety about the Good". He wrote about the ideal good versus the actual good that a single individual can do in the following way: "Ethics proposes to bring ideality into actuality. On the other hand, it is not the nature of its movement to raise actuality up into ideality. Ethics points to ideality as a task and assumes that every man possesses the requisite conditions. Thus ethics develops a contradiction, inasmuch as it makes clear both the difficulty and the impossibility." He was wondering how any existing human being can make any movement in an ideal world.

Kierkegaard begins this book with a short preface. By now he expects his readers to be aware that the preface is a key to the meaning of the book. Haufniensis uses the word "generation' several times as well as "epoch" and "era" in his introduction to prepare the reader for his subject. Progress from the "first science", ethics, to the "second science", psychology. Historians, psychologists, anthropologists, theologians and philosophers were all in agreement that the past must be preserved if there is to be a future for humankind. These soft sciences were of interest to Kierkegaard only in so far as they related to the progress of Christianity. His preface is followed by his first introduction since he published his thesis, The Concept of Irony. It could mark a new beginning but that is not known for certain.

Friedrich Schelling wrote Philosophical Inquiries into the Essence of Human Freedom in 1809, Georg Wilhelm Friedrich Hegel wrote his Science of Logic between 1812 and 1816, and Johann Friedrich Herbart wrote about pedagogy. All of them were discussing how good and evil come into existence. Kierkegaard questioned Hegel and Schelling's emphasis on the negative (evil) and aligned himself with Hebart's emphasis on the positive (good). Kierkegaard says "anxiety about sin produces sin" in this book and later says it again: 

All of them were involved with the dialectical question of exactly "how" an individual, or group, or race changes from good to evil or evil to good. Kierkegaard pressed forward with his category of "the single individual." Kierkegaard's Introduction is in Primary sources below.

Anxiety

Many men and women are anxious about whom they should marry and how they will pick the right person. The anxious person stands at the crossroads and wonders which way to go. Kierkegaard captured the sentiment in his book Either/Or, which is filled with examples of people at the crossroads. Johann Goethe (1749–1832) was at a crossroads and couldn't make up his mind about what he wanted so he talked to the devil about it in his play Faust. Adam Oehlenschläger (1779–1850) wrote a book about a single individual wanting to get married in his book Aladdin. He let a genie make up his mind for him. Kierkegaard points out that Isaac didn't have freedom to choose his wife either. He wrote:

Isaac presumably dared with a certain degree of assurance to expect that God would surely choose a wife for him who was young and beautiful and highly regarded by the people and lovable in every way, but nevertheless we lack the erotic, even if it was the case that he loved this one chosen of God with all the passion of youth. Freedom was lacking. Either/Or II, Hong p 44 Isaac had expectations, but he didn't have an easy time just because God made his choice for him. Both freedom and anxiety were absent in these examples of three personal choices but ignorance was present because none of them were personally involved in a very important decision.

Neither Goethe nor Oehlenschläger tell the reader if Faust or Alladin was faithful to the one chosen for him, they just end the story. But Isaac's story continued and showed that he was faithful to the choice made for him. Kierkegaard questions: how a person can remain faithful to a choice that is made by others? The others are external powers whereas his spirit is an internal power. All three stories deal with the world of the spirit. Kierkegaard thinks the "spirit is a hostile and a friendly power at the same time". He wrote: "That anxiety makes its appearance pivotal. Man is a synthesis of the psychical and the physical; however, a synthesis is unthinkable if the two are not united in a third. This third is spirit. In innocence, man is not merely animal, for if he were at any moment of his life merely animal, he would never become man. So spirit is present, but is immediate, as dreaming. It is in a sense a hostile power, for it constantly disturbs the relation between soul and body, a relation that indeed has persistence and yet does not have endurance, inasmuch as it first receives the latter by the spirit. On the other hand, spirit is a friendly power, since it is precisely that which constitutes the relation. What, then, is man’s relation to this ambiguous power? How does spirit relate itself to itself and to its conditionality? It relates itself as anxiety. Do away with itself, the spirit cannot; lay hold of itself, it cannot, as long as it has itself outside itself. Nor can man sink down into the vegetative, for he is qualified as spirit; flee away from anxiety, he cannot, for he loves it; really love it, he cannot, for he flees from it. Innocence has now reached its uttermost point. It is ignorance; however, it is not an animal brutality but an ignorance qualified as spirit, and as such innocence is precisely anxiety, because its ignorance is about nothing. Here there is no knowledge of good and evil etc., but the whole actuality of knowledge projects itself in anxiety as the enormous nothing of ignorance. The Concept of Anxiety, p. 43–44

This "ambiguous power" is discussed further in Kierkegaard's 1847 book Upbuilding Discourses in Various Spirits and his 1848 book Christian Discourses where he finds himself standing against his own best intentions. 

Kierkegaard was interested in how an individual can keep faith awake and hope alive.

Supernaturalism

The Brothers Grimm were writing about the use of folktales as educational stories to keep individuals from falling into evil hands. Kierkegaard refers to The Story of the Youth Who Went Forth to Learn What Fear Was in The Concept of Anxiety (p. 155). Can the "power of the example", or theatre pedagogy, or the theatre of the absurd, help an individual learn how to find the good? Danish folklore was at this time also coming to the attention of pedagogs. Imagination can be of assistance but it can also keep an individual from making crucial decisions. But failing to "become honest with yourself so that you do not deceive yourself with imagined power, with which you experience imagined victory in imagined struggle" is how a decision can become an impossibility.

What's keeping him from making the decision? Nothing except the imagination of the individual involved in making the decision, imaginations of guilt and sin and fear and rejection. In Fear and Trembling Abraham had to choose to follow God or call him a monster. In Repetition the Young Man had to choose to get married or to follow his love of writing. Both were "imaginative constructions" created by Kierkegaard that dealt with hope and love.

Kierkegaard felt that imaginative constructions should be upbuilding. Kierkegaard wrote about "the nothing of despair", God as the unknown is nothing, and death is a nothing. Goethe's Der Erlkönig and The Bride of Corinth (1797) are also nothing. The single individual has a reality which fiction can never represent. People should learn the difference between imaginary constructions and reality. Many things are hard to understand but Kierkegaard says, "Where understanding despairs, faith is already present in order to make the despair properly decisive."

The first sin

Kierkegaard is not concerned with what Eve's sin was, he says it wasn't sensuousness, but he is concerned with how Eve learned that she was a sinner. He says "consciousness presupposes itself. Eve became conscious of her first sin through her choice and Adam became conscious of his first sin through his choice. God's gift to Adam and Eve was the "knowledge of freedom" and they both decided to use it. In Kierkegaard's Journals he said,  "the one thing needful" for the doctrine of Atonement to make sense was the "anguished conscience." He wrote, "Remove the anguished conscience, and you may as well close the churches and turn them into dance halls."

Kierkegaard says, every person has to find out for him or her self how guilt and sin came into their worlds. Kierkegaard argued about this in both Repetition and Fear and Trembling where he said philosophy must not define faith. He asks his reader, the single individual, to consider some questions. Can sin and guilt be transferred from one person to another? Is it "an epidemic that spreads like cowpox"? Was every Jewish person responsible for the crucifixion of Christ? Does the single individual find sin in others or in him or herself? He believed in a rigorous self-inspection and at the same time a lenient inspection of others. He put it this way in Four Upbuilding Discourses of 1844: 

What was the intention of Christianity? Does the concept emerge through definitions and examples? Sin and guilt are both religious categories as far as Kierkegaard is concerned. He wrote:

Kierkegaard observes that it was the prohibition itself not to eat of the tree of knowledge that gave birth to sin in Adam. The prohibition predisposes that which breaks forth in Adam's qualitative leap. He questions the doctrine of Original Sin, also called Ancestral sin., "The doctrine that Adam and Christ correspond to each other confuses things. Christ alone is an individual who is more than an individual. For this reason he does not come in the beginning but in the fullness of time." Sin has a "coherence in itself".

In Philosophical Fragments Kierkegaard described the Learner in Error before God. Here he questions how the Learner discovers this Error. New sciences were emerging that challenged the conventional ethics of the time as well as the notions of guilt and sin. Kierkegaard described the struggle elegantly. He says, <blockquote>"Ethics and dogmatics struggle over reconciliation in a border area fraught with fate. Repentance and guilt torment forth reconciliation ethically, while dogmatics in this receptivity to the proffered reconciliation, has the historically concrete immediacy with which it begins its discourse in the great dialogue of science. And now what will be the result?" and "Innocence is ignorance, but how is it lost?" The Concept of Anxiety P. 12, 39</blockquote>

Kierkegaard also writes about an individual's disposition in The Concept of Anxiety. He was impressed with the psychological views of Johann Karl Friedrich Rosenkranz who wrote: 

We are all predisposed to certain actions, some good some evil. Are these habits or sins? "How does a person learn earnestness?" Kierkegaard and Rosenkranz thought it was a good idea for a person to find out about their own dispositions so he or she can live a happier life. 

Mediation

Kierkegaard believed "each generation has its own task and need not trouble itself unduly by being everything to previous and succeeding generations". In an earlier book he had said, "to a certain degree every generation and every individual begins his life from the beginning", and in another, "no generation has learned to love from another, no generation is able to begin at any other point than the beginning", "no generation learns the essentially human from a previous one. He was against the Hegelian idea of mediation because it introduces a "third term" that comes between the single individual and the object of desire. Kierkegaard is essentially asking if the teaching of a child begins with the prohibition or with love. In other words, does Christianity say to first teach about "the works of the flesh" (the negative) or about the "Fruit of the Holy Spirit" (the positive)?  Does the answer lie in the world of the spirit or in the world of temporality? Should we always go backwards to review the negative or forward because we are concentrating on the positive. Or should there be a balance between the two? And he just puts the question out there as part of the "great dialogue of science" for consideration. He began this discussion in his Two Upbuilding Discourses of 1843 in Galatians chapter 3 (There is neither Jew nor Greek, slave nor free, male nor female, for you are all one in Christ Jesus).

Kierkegaard is wondering if one generation can learn wonder, love, anxiety, peace, patience, hope, from a previous generation or if each "single individual" in each generation must learn these things, for the most part, on their own. He asked the same question in Philosophical Fragments about how someone learns to become a Christian. Are we Christian because of our family and personal history or because we have made a "decisive resolution"? What kind of goods is the Christian looking to gain? Isn't hope a good and despair an evil in yourself that you work to change into the good called hope? Isn't patience a good and impatience an evil that can be changed if you want to change it? Isn't your soul a good? Is the soul given to the chosen few or is it given as a free gift to all, without merit?  Is our future a matter of fate, of choice, or a combination of both? Kierkegaard answers this way: 

Eternity
Kierkegaard repeats the synthesis again in The Sickness unto Death  and he tied it to his idea of the "Moment" from Philosophical Fragments. He says, "For the Greeks, the eternal lies behind as the past that can only be entered backwards. The category I maintain should be kept in mind, repetition, by which eternity is entered forwards."  Kierkegaard wrote Edifying Discourses in Diverse Spirits in 1847. He said, "A Providence watches over each man's wandering through life. It provides him with two guides. The one calls him forward. The other calls him back. They are, however, not in opposition to each other, these two guides, nor do they leave the wanderer standing there in doubt, confused by the double call. Rather the two are in eternal understanding with each other. For the one beckons forward to the Good, the other calls man back from evil. These guides are called repentance and remorse. The eager traveler hurries forward to the new, to the novel, and, indeed, away from experience. But the remorseful one, who comes behind, laboriously gathers up experience. Kierkegaard also mentions this idea in his Journals. He wrote: "It is quite true what philosophy says; that life must be understood backwards. But then one forgets the other principle: that it must be lived forwards. Which principle, the more one thinks it through, ends exactly with the thought that temporal life can never properly be understood precisely because I can at no instant find complete rest in which to adopt a position: backwards.

The English poet Christina Rossetti said the same thing in her poem Advent: "The days are evil looking back, The coming days are dim; Yet count we not His promise slack, But watch and wait for Him." If we want to look back to the age of Constantine The Great and start there in our search for Christianity we will go forward and think that an emperor can create millions of Christians by edict. Constantin Constantius wanted to do that in Repetition. Goethe wanted to start with the black plague in Faust or with the Lisbon earthquake in his autobiography. These are negative beginnings. Both Rossetti and Kierkegaard take this present age as a starting point. Now the single individual interested in becoming a Christian can go forward toward a goal without continually looking over the shoulder.

Hegel looks at eternity as an unfolding, or a transition, from stage to stage, from the Persian, to the Syrian, to the Egyptian religion as Object, Good. Kierkegaard didn't want to be double-minded about the good, and, after his own fashion, created his own system of good in 1847 in Edifying Discourses in Diverse Spirits. He brought eternity into relation with his own feelings of guilt in relation to Regine Olsen, his fiancé, in Stages on Life's Way (1845) because he had so much anxiety about disclosing his inner being to her, it was "terrifying". However, early on, Kierkegaard had written about moving forward in regard to himself, Regine, and any other single individual. He wrote the following in 1843 and 1845.  

Contemporary reception
Walter Lowrie translated The Concept of Dread in 1944. He was asked "almost petulantly" why it took him so long to translate the book. Alexander Dru had been working on the book and Charles Williams hoped the book would be published along with The Sickness unto Death, which Lowrie was working on in 1939. Then the war started and Dru was wounded and gave the job over to Lowrie. Lowrie could find "no adequate word to use for Angst. Lee Hollander had used the word dread in 1924, a Spanish translator used angustia, and Miguel Unamuno, writing in French used agonie while other French translators used angoisse. Rollo May quoted Kierkegaard in his book Meaning of Anxiety, which is the relation between anxiety and freedom. 

The book seems to be highly interpretive in its title. Is it dread, anxiety, angst, or sin? Or is the final word of the title something else. It's up to the individual reader to determine that. If the single individual can't make a choice as to the meaning of a word then all choice has been taken away from the individual. Lowrie decided the book deals with "an apprehension of the future, a presentiment of a something which is a nothing" which must be fought against. But fought on the inside with oneself about what "you" as the single individual can become. Professor Lorraine Clark put it this way in 1991, "Existence is not just a given but also a task, Kierkegaard insists-the task of becoming oneself; for "actuality (the historical actuality) relates itself in a two-fold way to the subject: partly as a gift which will not admit of being rejected, and partly as a task to be realized" (Concept of Irony, Hong p. 293). One cannot become all possibilities simultaneously in reality (however possible this may be in thought, as he readily acknowledges); one must become some one thing in particular. Otherwise, one remains abstract." And Lee Hollander writes of what he perceived as Kierkegaard's problem which could also be every individual's problem. In previous works Kierkegaard had already intimated that what furnished man the impetus to rise into the highest sphere and to assail passionately and incessantly the  barrier of the paradox, or else caused him to lapse into "demonic despair", was the consciousness of sin. In the book Begrebet Angest The Concept of Sin, he now attempts with an infinite and laborious subtlety to explain the nature of sin. Its origin is found in the "sympathetic antipathy" of Dread -that force which at one and the same time attracts and repels from the suspected danger of a fall and is present even in the state of innocence, in children. It finally results in a kind of "dizziness" which is fatal. Yet, so Kierkegaard contends, the "fall" of man is, in every single instance, due to a definite act of the will, a "leap" – which seems a patent contradiction. To the modern reader, this is the least palatable of Kierkegaard's works, conceived as it is with a sovereign and almost medieval disregard of the predisposing undeniable factors of environment and heredity (which, to be sure, poorly fit his notion of the absolute responsibility of the individual). Its somberness is redeemed, to a certain degree, by a series of marvelous observations, drawn from history and literature, on the various phases and manifestations of Dread in human life. Selections from the writings of Kierkegaard,  Translated by L. M. Hollander 1923 pp. 27–28

Robert Harold  Bonthius discusses Kierkegaard's idea of dread in his 1948 book Christian Paths to Self-Acceptance, "Because the original Reformation and the subsequent Protestant scholastic doctrines of man’s depravity are distorted by literal ism, we will turn to those in our day who have revived Reformation thought, the so-called neo-orthodox theologians, for explanation of this profound view of sin and its importance for true self-acceptance. It is important to bear in mind, however, that man’s sinfulness is still conceived of the preached about in the undialectical forms of the past. Especially is this characteristic of flourishing sectarian bodies here in America-groups which are able to number their adherents in tens of thousands. It is Soren Kierkegaard of Denmark who has provided the key to modern reinterpretation of this austere doctrine of sin with his analysis of the relation of sin to anxiety. "Dread or anxiety", he explained "is the psychological condition which precedes sin, comes as near as possible to it, and is as provocative as possible of dread, but without explaining sin, which breaks forth first in the qualitative leap." Kierkegaard saw this "sickness unto death" as the inherent factor in human existence, and he taught that a "synthesis" was needed, by which he meant a vital relationship of man with God by which man may resolve his inner conflicts and live at peace with himself."

Hunt, George Laird interpreted Kierkegaard's writing as basically asking "How can we understand ourselves?" He wrote the following in 1958: What makes man human? Although Kierkegaard does not emphasize the word, he thinks of man in terms of his creatureliness. Man's creatureliness lies in the fact that he stands between life and death. Made in the image of God, he knows what it means to feel the presence of eternity. Feeling the nearness of eternity, utterly dependent upon it for his meaning, he also knows that he dies, and that he cannot escape death. These two factors constitute both his problem and his possibility of for immortality, creates his anguish or his nervous humanness. Man sins in that he is unwilling to live in faith and therefore to be nervously human. He prefers to live either with life or with death but not with both. He seeks to escape creatureliness either by pretending that he will not die or by assuming that there is no eternity. He refuses to bear uncertainty and anguish. Either he turns his back on death by pretending that immortality is automatically a part of all life or he tries to forget his anguish by becoming an animal. It is precisely this anguish, this willingness to live neither as an animal (unaware of eternity) nor as an angel (indifferent to death), which marks the humanness from which we fall when we sin. It is also this greatness. Knowing mortality, even while he hungers humanness, this willingness to risk death as we trust God, which signals the beginning of our redemption. Ten makers of modern Protestant thought Schweitzer, Rauschenbusch, Temple, Kierkegaard, Barth, Brunner, Niebuhr, Tillich, Bultmann, Buber pp. 55–56

 Mortimer J. Adler, Director, Institute for Philosophical Research, answered a newspaper question about existentialism asked in 1965: He was asked, "Dear Dr. Adler: What exactly is existentialism? Can a person be a Christian and, at the same time, be an existentialist?"  "There are two kinds of existentialist", Jean-Paul Sartre declared in 1947–"the Christian and the atheistic existentialist." Existentialism means, Sartre explained, that "first of all, man exists, turns up, appears on the scene; and then, only afterwards, man defines himself". (...)  Rational thought was no help; in fact, rational explanations are presumptuous and ridiculous, according to Kierkegaard, because no man can have his identity or duty shown to him by reason. The only way for an individual to discover himself is to investigate his own unique existence-his own stresses, desires, tensions. Only through such an inquiry can an individual grasp any truth-insofar as truth is available to the individual. A true Christian, Kierkegaard continues, must recognize that he exists in a mysterious, irrational world, where he must choose with no possibility of knowing whether the outcome will be his salvation or damnation. This "existential" choice, he explains, involves a "leap of faith". ... Although atheistic existentialists reject Kierkegaard’s belief in God, they tend to accept his idea of the unique, solitary individual who can discover himself only through personal choices and actions. "The existentialist thinks it extremely distressing that God does not exist," Sartre declares, "because all possibility of finding values in a heaven of ideas disappears along with Him." Without God or absolute values, men are "condemned to be free," Sartre continues, "Because once a man is thrown into this world, he is responsible for everything he does."

Walter Kaufmann discussed the existentialism of Sartre and Kierkegaard in his 1960 lecture Kierkegaard and the Crisis in Religion. The lecture is in Primary sources below under See also.

Kierkegaard offered an avenue of hope for those who have anxiety and human nervousness near the end of this little book. 

See also
Hans Urs von Balthasar The Christian and Anxiety, 1952, 1994
René Descartes, Meditations on First Philosophy, 1641

Notes

References
Footnotes

Bibliography
 Søren Kierkegaard The Concept of Anxiety: A Simple Psychologically Orienting Deliberation on the Dogmatic Issue of Hereditary Sin  June 17, 1844 Vigilius Haufniensis, Edited and translated by Reidar Thomte  Princeton University Press 1980  Kierkegaard's Writings, VIII 
 Søren Kierkegaard "The Concept of Anxiety" 1844, translation by Alastair Hannay, March 2014 Kirkus Review
 Søren Kierkegaard The Concept of Anxiety The only book by Kierkegaard in audio format (Hannay translation)
Søren Kierkegaard, The Concept of Anxiety, Introduction, Marxists.org
Johann Karl Friedrich Rosenkranz, Rosenkranz's Philosophy of Education (February 18, 1887), Science, Vol. 9
Anthony D. Storm, Anthony D. Storm's Commentary on The Concept of Anxiety

External links

 Walter Lowrie, The Concept of Dread free text from archive.org
Arne Grøn, The Concept of Anxiety in Soren Kierkegaard  Mercer University Press, Oct 1, 2008 Retrieved 1/15/2012
Walter Kaufmann,  Kierkegaard and the Crisis in Religion 1960 Audio Archive.org
 Rollo May, The Meaning of Anxiety 1950, 1996 p. 170ff
 Professor Alison Assiter, Kierkegaard and Kant on Freedom and Evil, YouTube 
Dr. Patrick McCarty, Anxiety: Its Source, Nature, Solution Audio about The Concept of Anxiety from Archive.org
Henrik Stangerup, The Man Who Wanted To Be Guilty'' July 2000
Arland Ussher, Journey Through Dread: A Study of Kierkegaard, Heidegger, and Sartre 1955

1844 books
Books by Søren Kierkegaard
Philosophy of religion literature
Works published under a pseudonym
Psychology books
Anxiety